Feliks Topolski RA (14 August 1907 – 24 August 1989) was a Polish expressionist painter and draughtsman working primarily in the United Kingdom.

Biography
Feliks Topolski was born on 14 August 1907 in Warsaw, Poland. He studied in the Academy of Fine Arts in Warsaw, and trained as an artillery officer.

Later he studied and worked in Italy and France, and eventually he moved to Britain in 1935 after being commissioned to record King George V's silver jubilee. He opened a studio near Waterloo station, which later became an exhibition and then a café-bar featuring his art.

He married twice, first to Marian Everall and then Caryl J. Stanley.

In 1939 the George Bernard Shaw plays In Good King Charles's Golden Days and Geneva were published with illustrations by Topolski, bringing his work to a wide audience in the UK.

During the Second World War, Topolski became an official war artist and painted scenes of the Battle of Britain and other battlefields. In 1941, Topolski travelled to Russia alongside the men of 151 Wing RAF on board the RMS Llanstephan Castle, which was sailing to the port Archangelsk as part of Operation Benedict, a mission to provide air support in defence of the port of Murmansk. Topolski was travelling as an accredited War Artist for both Polish and British governments. He was also under contract to Picture Post magazine, which published many of his drawings after his return.

After the war he made a celebrated painting about the first meeting of the United Nations. In 1947 he gained British citizenship. His work was also part of the painting event in the art competition at the 1948 Summer Olympics.

Topolski's experiences were initially captured in pencil and ink drawings. These were the first stage of his prolific Chronicles, which appeared fortnightly from 1953 to 1979, interrupted only to accommodate his exploratory investigations across the globe. The Chronicles communicated his art and observations to a wider audience. They were independently published, without advertisements or subsidies. Since his death in 1989 Topolski's Chronicles have retained respect as a pictorial and political record spanning nearly 30 years of world history. The Chronicles contain 3,000 drawings, and were exhibited in New York City, Moscow, Cologne, Hamburg, Hawaii, Tel Aviv and serialised in the United States, Poland, Italy, Denmark and Switzerland. Joyce Cary wrote, it is "the most brilliant record we have of the contemporary scene as seized by a contemporary mind."

In 1959, Prince Philip, Duke of Edinburgh, commissioned Topolski to create a mural depicting the coronation of Queen Elizabeth II. The mural contains 14 friezes divided into two narratives; one narrative; entitled "In The Streets" shows various processions to Westminster Abbey, while the second, entitled "In The Abbey", depicts the procession out of the Abbey after the coronation.

Topolski painted portraits of contemporaries, including the authors H. G. Wells, Graham Greene, John Mortimer and Evelyn Waugh, and politicians Harold Macmillan and Aneurin Bevan, He also painted murals, contributed to BBC programmes, such as the caricatures of guests used in Face to Face and designed theatrical sets. Between 1975 and his death he worked on a 600 ft mural in a studio in railway arches near London's South Bank, depicting events and people of the 20th century. It opened to the public as a free permanent exhibition called Topolski Century. In 2014 it was re-opened as a café-bar called Topolski, featuring his art.

In 1989 he was elected a senior Royal Academician as a draughtsman.

Feliks Topolski died in London on 24 August 1989 at the age of 82. He is buried in Highgate Cemetery, north London.

He had a daughter, Theresa, and a son, Daniel, a rower who captained and coached Oxford in the Boat Race.

Books illustrated
 Bernard Shaw, Geneva', London: Constable & Co. Ltd, 1939.
 Britain in Peace and War. London: Methuen, 1941.
 Bernard Shaw, Pygmalion, Harmondsworth: Penguin, 1941.
 Russia in War: London, summer 1941; Russia-bound convoy; a British cruiser; Iceland. London: Methuen, 1942.
 Jozef H. Retinger, Conrad and his contemporaries, New York: Roy Publishers, 1943.
 Three Continents, 1944–45: England, Mediterranean convoy, Egypt, East Africa, Palestine, Lebanon, Syria, Iraq, India, Burma front, China, Italian campaign, Germany defeated. London: Methuen, 1946.
 Face to Face, 1964.
 Richard J. Whalen, A City Destroying Itself: An Angry View of New York, New York: William Morrow and Co., 1965.
 Tony Palmer, The Trials of Oz London, Blond and Briggs, 1971.

See also
 Topolski Century, mural artwork on South Bank, London, UK

 References 

Further reading
 Feliks Topolski: Fourteen Letters''. London: Faber, 1988

External links
 
Topolski Century gallery

1907 births
1989 deaths
20th-century Polish painters
Polish graphic designers
Polish illustrators
Polish war artists
Artists from Warsaw
Polish emigrants to the United Kingdom
20th-century British painters
British male painters
Expressionist painters
Burials at Highgate Cemetery
British war artists
World War II artists
Academy of Fine Arts in Warsaw alumni
Royal Academicians
Olympic competitors in art competitions
Polish male painters
20th-century British male artists